Csesztve is a village in Nógrád county, Hungary.

Etymology
The name comes from a Slavic personal name Čestovoj, Častovoj.  1255 Chestue, 1339 Chestwe.

External links 
 Street map

References

Populated places in Nógrád County